Tsitsutl Peak is the highest volcanic peak of the Rainbow Range in British Columbia, Canada, located within Tweedsmuir South Provincial Park,  northwest of Anahim Lake and  northeast of Thunder Mountain.

Name origin
"Tsitsutl" means "painted mountains" in the local native language, and is a reference to the Rainbow Range in general.
"

See also
 Rainbow Range
 Ilgachuz Range
 Itcha Range
 Anahim Volcanic Belt
 List of volcanoes in Canada
 Anahim hotspot

References
 Canadian Mountain Encyclopedia
 

Anahim Volcanic Belt
Landforms of the Chilcotin
Two-thousanders of British Columbia
Range 3 Coast Land District